In mathematics, there is a folklore claim that there is no analogue of Lebesgue measure on an infinite-dimensional Banach space. The theorem this refers to states that there is no translationally invariant measure on a separable Banach space - because if any ball has nonzero non-infinite volume, a slightly smaller ball has zero volume, and countable many such smaller balls cover the space. The folklore statement, however, is entirely false. The countable product of Lebesgue measure is translationally invariant and gives the intuitive notion of volume as the infinite product of lengths, only the domain on which this product measure is defined must necessarily be non-separable, and the measure itself is not sigma finite.

There are other kinds of measures with support entirely on separable Banach spaces: the abstract Wiener space construction gives the analog of products of Gaussian measures, which are not translationally invariant. Alternatively, one may consider Lebesgue measure on finite-dimensional subspaces of the larger space and consider so-called prevalent and shy sets.

The Hilbert cube carries the product Lebesgue measure, and the compact topological group given by the Tychonoff product of infinitely many copies of the circle group is infinite-dimensional, and carries a Haar measure that is translation-invariant. These two spaces can be mapped onto each other in a measure preserving way by unwrapping the circles into intervals. The infinite product of the additive real numbers has the analogous product Haar measure, which is precisely the infinite dimensional analog of Lebesgue measure.

Motivation

It can be shown that Lebesgue measure  on Euclidean space  is locally finite, strictly positive and translation-invariant, explicitly:
 every point  in  has an open neighbourhood  with finite measure 
 every non-empty open subset  of  has positive measure  and
 if  is any Lebesgue-measurable subset of    denotes the translation map, and  denotes the push forward, then 

Geometrically speaking, these three properties make Lebesgue measure very nice to work with. When we consider an infinite-dimensional space such as an  space or the space of continuous paths in Euclidean space, it would be nice to have a similarly nice measure to work with. Unfortunately, this is not possible.

Statement of the theorem

Let  be an infinite-dimensional, separable Banach space.

Proof of the theorem

Let  be an infinite-dimensional, separable Banach space equipped with a locally finite, translation-invariant measure  
Like every separable metric space,  is a Lindelöf space, which means that every open cover of  has a countable subcover.

Using local finiteness, suppose that, for some  the open ball  of radius  has finite -measure. Since  is infinite-dimensional, by Riesz's lemma there is an infinite sequence of pairwise disjoint open balls   of radius  with all the smaller balls  contained within the larger ball  By translation-invariance, all of the smaller balls have the same measure; since the sum of these measures is finite, the smaller balls must all have -measure zero.

See also

References

  (See section 1: Introduction)
 

Articles containing proofs
Banach spaces
Measure theory
Theorems in measure theory

Theorems in analysis